Easy Street is a 1930 American film by Oscar Micheaux, an African American filmmaker. It features an African American cast. Known as the last silent achievement in his filmography, the film is considered lost. The plot reportedly revolved around a group of con artists trying to seize the savings of an old man.

The cast included Richard B. Harrison and other actors from the Broadway production Green Pastures. Micheaux's wife Alice B. Russell was part of the cast. William A. Clayton, Willor Lee Guilford and Lorenzo Tucker were also in the cast.

A poster for the film is extant.

References

1930 films
1930 lost films
Lost American films
African-American films